Hillsong Church has produced hundreds of Christian songs on albums since 1992 on more than fifty albums, mostly under their own label, Hillsong Music. This is a list of Hillsong's notable worship leaders and musicians who have written, sung, and/or played instruments on one or more albums.

Current worship leaders

Taya Smith 

Smith has been at Hillsong since the late 2000s to early 2010s. She started on Hillsong's youth band Hillsong Young & Free then she went on to sing on some Hillsong United albums and some Hillsong Worship albums.

Reuben Morgan 

Morgan serves as Hillsong's worship pastor, replacing Darlene Zschech in 2008. Originally, alongside Marty Sampson, he was asked by Zschech to start a youth worship band for the church which is now known as Hillsong United. He has written the majority of Hillsong's newer songs and is also the Worship Pastor at Hillsong London.

Joel Houston 

Houston is one of the worship leaders at Hillsong. He is the eldest son of Hillsong's Global Senior Pastors Brian & Bobbie Houston, and has been writing songs for Hillsong for many years. Originally he was a guitar player for Hillsong United and soon became United's Worship Leader after Reuben Morgan & Marty Sampson joined the main Hillsong Band. Joel currently serves as Hillsong's Creative Director and is currently the Co-Lead Pastor of Hillsong New York City when it opened in October 2010.

Brooke Fraser Ligertwood 

Brooke in recent years has been a part of the Hillsong team after moving to Australia from New Zealand. She is also a famous New Zealand singer/songwriter, performing under her maiden name as Brooke Fraser. She has sung on both Hillsong Live albums alongside Darlene Zschech and as a part of Hillsong United with Joel Houston. Her song "What A Beautiful Name" won the Grammy award 2018 for "Best Contemporary Christian Music Performance/Song".

Marty Sampson 

Sampson was one of Hillsong's key musicians and songwriters. Alongside Reuben Morgan, he originally led Hillsong's youth band Hillsong United, and then led worship in the main Hillsong Band alongside Darlene Zschech and Morgan. He has led worship at two of Hillsong New York City's Focus Nights alongside the Hillsong team as well as sung and written new songs on Hillsong United's album Aftermath including singing on the title track. He helped lead worship at one of the many Hillsong extension services. As of 2019, he no longer publicly identifies as a Christian.

Aodhan King 

Aodhan King is a key songwriter and worship leader of Hillsong's Y&F. He has also made numerous contributions to both Hillsong United and Hillsong Worship.

Previous worship leaders

Darlene Zschech 

Darlene Zschech is arguably the most well-known of Hillsong's musicians. She is the former worship pastor (1995–2007) and the longest-serving member of Hillsong's worship team. She and her husband, Mark, became the new senior pastors of Hope Unlimited Church on the Central Coast of New South Wales. She continues, however, to be part of Hillsong Church and remains a key member of the church's senior leadership team alongside Hillsong's senior pastors Brian and Bobbie Houston. Zschech continues to lead worship at key Hillsong events throughout the year, including being a part of the executive team for the Colour Your World Women's Conference and the annual Hillsong Conference, while also continuing to lead tours with the Hillsong Team around the world. Darlene still remains the Senior Lead Vocal on all of Hillsong's annual Live Albums and many other Hillsong songs, including recently Hillsong's newest single "It is Well with My Soul", a remake of the traditional hymn with all the proceeds going towards the victims of the 2011 Queensland Floods. Darlene also continues to host the Creative Worship stream at Hillsong Conference, and has written over 80 songs of praise and worship that have been published by Hillsong Music alone.

Geoff Bullock 

Geoff Bullock wrote most of the songs on the earlier albums. He was the original Worship Pastor of Hillsong but was replaced by Darlene Zschech after he left Hillsong in the mid-1990s.

Miriam Webster 

Miriam Webster has written many songs and has appeared on Hillsong albums since 1997. She has been featured as the lead vocal for several songs alongside Darlene Zschech. She has recently relocated to minister in the United States but also sang in a Medley of Classic Hillsong songs at the 25th anniversary celebrations of Hillsong Conference.

See also 

 List of Hillsong albums
 List of Hillsong songs

References